Alfred Tauber (5 November 1866 – 26 July 1942) was a Hungarian-born Austrian mathematician, known for his contribution to mathematical analysis and to the theory of functions of a complex variable: he is the eponym of an important class of theorems with applications ranging from mathematical and harmonic analysis to number theory. He was murdered in the Theresienstadt concentration camp.

Life and academic career
Born in Pressburg, Kingdom of Hungary, Austrian Empire (now Bratislava, Slovakia), he began studying mathematics at Vienna University in 1884, obtained his Ph.D. in 1889, and his habilitation in 1891.
Starting from 1892, he worked as chief mathematician at the Phönix insurance company until 1908, when he became an a.o. professor at the University of Vienna, though, already from 1901, he had been honorary professor at TU Vienna and director of its insurance mathematics chair. In 1933, he was awarded the Grand Decoration of Honour in Silver for Services to the Republic of Austria, and retired as emeritus extraordinary professor. However, he continued lecturing as a privatdozent until 1938, when he was forced to resign as a consequence of the "Anschluss". On 28–29 June 1942, he was deported with transport IV/2, č. 621 to Theresienstadt, where he was murdered on 26 July 1942.

Work
 list 35 publications in the bibliography appended to his obituary, and also a search performed on the "Jahrbuch über die Fortschritte der Mathematik" database results in a list 35 mathematical works authored by him, spanning a period of time from 1891 to 1940. Tauber's most important scientific contributions belong to the first of his research areas, even if his work on potential theory has been overshadowed by the one of Aleksandr Lyapunov.

Tauberian theorems
In this paper, he succeeded in proving a converse to Abel's theorem for the first time: this result was the starting point of numerous investigations, leading to the proof and to applications of several theorems of such kind for various summability methods. The statement of these theorems has a standard structure: if a series  is summable according to a given summability method and satisfies an additional condition, called "Tauberian condition", then it is a convergent series. Starting from 1913 onward, G. H. Hardy and J. E. Littlewood used the term Tauberian to identify this class of theorems. Describing with a little more detail Tauber's 1897 work, it can be said that his main achievements are the following two theorems:

. If the series  is Abel summable to sum , i.e.

In the remaining part of his paper, by using the theorem above, Tauber proved the following, more general result:

. The series  converges to sum  if and only if the two following conditions are satisfied:
  is Abel summable and
 .

Contributions to the theory of Hilbert transform
 writes that Tauber contributed at an early stage to theory of the now called "Hilbert transform", anticipating with his contribution the works of Hilbert and Hardy in such a way that the transform should perhaps bear their three names. Precisely,  considers the real part  and imaginary part  of a power series ,

where
 with  being the absolute value of the given complex variable,
 for every natural number ,

Under the hypothesis that  is less than the convergence radius  of the power series , Tauber proves that  and  satisfy the two following equations:

the complex valued continuous function  defined on a given circle is the boundary value of a holomorphic function defined in its open disk if and only if the two following conditions are satisfied
 the function  is uniformly integrable in every neighborhood of the point , and
 the function  satisfies .

Selected publications 
.
.
.
.
.
.

See also
Actuarial science
Hardy–Littlewood tauberian theorem
Summability theory

Notes

References

Biographical and general references

.
.
.
 .

Scientific references
, and also . 
, 2nd Edition published by Chelsea Publishing Company, 1991, .
.
.
.
.

External links 
 
 Alfred Tauber at encyclopedia.com
 

1866 births
1942 deaths
19th-century Hungarian mathematicians
20th-century Hungarian mathematicians
Mathematical analysts
Hungarian people who died in the Theresienstadt Ghetto
Scientists from Bratislava
Austro-Hungarian mathematicians
University of Vienna alumni
Academic staff of TU Wien
Academic staff of the University of Vienna
Hungarian people executed in Nazi concentration camps